FRS Iberia/Maroc are three independent companies operating under a single brand, one based in Morocco (FRS Maroc) and the two others (FRS Iberia and Ferrysur) in Spain, founded in 2000 by their parent company Förde Reederei Seetouristik.  The companies operate mainly in the Strait of Gibraltar with a fleet of five ferries.

Routes 
FRS Iberia/Maroc operates services across the Strait of Gibraltar from Tarifa, Motril and Algeciras to Ceuta, Tangier and Tanger-Med.
On 23 May 2018 it was announced that FRS Iberia will acquire the routes Melilla-Motril and Huelva-Las Palmas-S. C. Tenerife from Naviera Armas due to monopoly concerns on the acquisition of Trasmediterranea by Armas. The necessary equipment is included in the deal.

Fleet

Current vessels
FRS Iberia/Maroc currently operates a fleet of five vessels.

Past vessels

 Thundercat I - since 2008 MS MegaJet with Seajet
 Nicea - sold for scrap in 2010
 Eurovoyager - sold for scrap in 2012
 Stena Feronia - returned to Stena RoRo, on charter to Intershipping
 Tanger Jet II - sold in 2013 to Conferry and renamed to Virgin de Coromoto

External links
 Official website
 Parent company website

References

Ferry companies of Spain
Ferry companies of Morocco
Transport in Morocco
Organizations based in Tangier